"Love Never Dies" is the sixth and final single from Belinda Carlisle's Heaven on Earth album, released in 1988.

Track listing
"Love Never Dies" (single version)
"I Feel Free" (live)
"Circle in the Sand" (live)
"Heaven Is a Place on Earth" (live)

Charts

References
Belinda Carlisle 1987 singles at BelindaVault

1988 singles
Belinda Carlisle songs
Songs written by Charlotte Caffey
Songs written by Rick Nowels
Song recordings produced by Rick Nowels
MCA Records singles
Virgin Records singles
1987 songs